Rosalind Speirs (born 1951) is an Australian former film and television actress. She starred on several television series during the 1970s, including Silent Number,  and the television miniseries Power Without Glory. It was her role as Nellie Moran, wife of the main character John West (Martin Vaughan), that earned her a Logie Award for "Most Popular Australian Lead Actress" in 1977. Speirs was also a guest star in a storyline of Prisoner in 1980.

Career
Rosalind Speirs made her acting debut in the 1974 film Stone where she had a minor role as a prostitute. In her next film, The Man from Hong Kong (1975), she had a more substantial role playing the lead female Caroline Thorne. That same year, Speirs played herself in the grindhouse documentary film The Love Epidemic (1975). She also began a successful career in television appearing on Silent Number and Power Without Glory. At the 1977 Logie Awards, she won a Logie Award for "Most Popular Australian Lead Actress" for her portrayal of Nellie Moran in Power Without Glory.

In 1980, Speirs was cast as Caroline Simpson in the series Prisoner. She portrayed a young woman who, with her mother Vivienne Williams (Bernadette Gibson), were charged with the murder of her alcoholic and abusive father. Although she appeared in the series for a brief time, her character was involved in a number of significant storylines. These included their initial introduction at the original halfway house and becoming romantically involved with prison officer Deputy Governor Jim Fletcher (Gerard Maguire). She eventually left the series to become an agent appearing in her final role in the horror film Alison's Birthday (1981).

Filmography 
FILM

TELEVISION

References

External links

1951 births
Living people
Australian film actresses
Australian soap opera actresses
Actresses from Sydney
Logie Award winners
20th-century Australian actresses
21st-century Australian women
21st-century Australian people